Vesicular appendages of the epoöphoron are small pedunculated vesicles of the  fimbriae of the uterine tube, or connected to the broad ligament.  They were described by Giovanni Battista Morgagni and are remnants of the cranial part of the mesonephric duct. Typically they are asymptomatic.

In the male remnants of the paramesonephric duct may be present as well and are also known as appendix of testis or hydatid of Morgagni.

They are rarely absent, and are attached either to the free margin of the mesosalpinx or
to one of the fimbriae, and are pedunculated vesicles, filled with fluid, about the size of a small pea.
The pedicles frequently attain a considerable length.

See also
 Paratubal cyst

References

External links
 
 

Mammal female reproductive system